Turn Back the Hours is a 1928 American silent drama film directed by Howard Bretherton and starring Myrna Loy, Walter Pidgeon and Sam Hardy.

Cast
 Myrna Loy as Tiza Torreon  
 Walter Pidgeon as Philip Drake  
 Sam Hardy as 'Ace' Kearney  
 George E. Stone as Limey  
 Sheldon Lewis as 'Breed'  
 Josef Swickard as Colonel Torreon  
 Ann Brody as Maria  
 Nanette Valone as A Dancer  
 Joyzelle Joyner as A Cantina Girl

Preservation status
Prints survive at Cinematheque Royale de Belgique (Brussels) and UCLA Film & Television Archive.

References

Bibliography
 Emily W. Leider. Myrna Loy: The Only Good Girl in Hollywood. University of California Press, 2011.

External links
 
 

1928 films
1928 drama films
1920s English-language films
American silent feature films
Silent American drama films
Films directed by Howard Bretherton
American black-and-white films
Gotham Pictures films
1920s American films